Matthias Spanlang (February 20, 1887, in Kallham  – June 5, 1940, in Buchenwald concentration camp) was an Austrian priest, opponent of National Socialism and prisoner in Dachau and Buchenwald concentration camps. He was executed, probably by being crucified upside down, after baptizing a fellow inmate into the Catholic faith.

Early life and priesthood 
Matthias Spanlang came from a farming family living at the Steindlgut in Stockham. Due to his talent, he passed the Abitur after attending elementary school and the Petrinum college in Linz. He then studied Roman Catholic theology. On 31 July 1910 he was ordained a priest in Linz and subsequently worked as a parish vicar in various parishes. On 31 December 1925, the parish of St. Martin im Innkreis was entrusted to him for parish work.

Buchenwald Concentration Camp 
When meetings of Austrian National Socialists were held in Sankt Martin in 1931, Spannlang made himself unpopular in these circles through his sermons and newspaper articles. This eventually led to him being sent to Rieder prison on 24 May 1938 and from there to the Dachau concentration camp. Despite the willingness to release Spanlang from the Dachau concentration camp in December 1938, even though travel allowances were available and all conditions were met, Spanlang remained in the concentration camp. On 26 September 1939 he was transferred from Dachau to the Buchenwald concentration camp.

According to the report of a later released fellow prisoner, the Cistercian religious Konrad Just, Spanlang was taken to the detention bunker together with the priest Otto Neururer because both had carried out spiritual acts forbidden in the camp – in this case baptizing a fellow prisoner into the Catholic faith. According to Konrad Just, Neururer was hung naked and upside down on his feet until after 34 hours death occurred in agony, as a result of excessive blood rush in the head. Four days later, the evening appeal also reported the death of Father Spanlang, who was probably murdered in a similar way, although there is no certainty about the circumstances of his death.

Legacy 
In 1996, Otto Neururer was beatified by Pope John Paul II, but not Father Matthias Spanlang, as there is no certainty about the circumstances of his death.

References 

1887 births
1940 deaths
Austrian people who died in Buchenwald concentration camp
20th-century Austrian Roman Catholic priests